The 2016–17 Beşiktaş J.K. season was the club's 113th year since its foundation, 95th season of competitive football and the club's 58th season contesting the Süper Lig, the top division of Turkish football. Beşiktaş were the defending champions of the Süper Lig, having finished first in 2015–16. The 2016–17 season lasted from 30 June 2016 to 30 June 2017. Beşiktaş officially began their season on 8 July. The 41,903-capacity Vodafone Arena served as the home ground of the club.

The club began its competitive season with the 2016 Turkish Super Cup played against Galatasaray on 13 August 2016, in which they lost 4–1 after penalty shoot-out. The club competed in the UEFA Champions League directly in the group stages, as well as the Turkish Cup.

Season events
The club's official football kit manufacturer was Adidas. The 2016–17 kit designs were unveiled on 11 June 2016. The sponsors on the football kit are Vodafone on the chest, Beko on the back, Kalde on the sleeves and Coca-Cola on the shorts.

Sponsorship

Squad

On loan

Transfers

In

Out

Loans in

Loans out

Friendlies
Beşiktaş started their season on 8 July 2016 at Nevzat Demir Facilities, Ataşehir district of Istanbul, where they remained until 19 July 2016. The team traveled to Leogang municipality, Salzburg, on 20 July for three friendly matches. On 22 July, a fourth friendly match was announced against Olympiacos, to be played at the Vodafone Arena on 7 August. On 27 July, the friendly match against 1899 Hoffenheim was cancelled in the 53rd minute due to weather conditions, with the final score ending 0–0.

Beşiktaş played another exhibition game against Gaziantepspor on 3 September, between matchday 2 and 3 of the Süper Lig.

Competitions

Turkish Super Cup

Süper Lig

League table

Results summary

Results by matchday

Matches

Turkish Cup

Group stage

Knockout stage

UEFA Champions League

Group stage

The group stage draw was made on 25 August 2016 in Monaco. Beşiktaş will face Benfica, Napoli and Dynamo Kyiv.

UEFA Europa League

Beşiktaş ranked third in Champions League group stage and transferred to UEFA Europa League. Beşiktaş was one of the seeded teams on draw. Because Beşiktaş was one of the best four of third-ranked teams in Champions League group stage. In the round of 32, Beşiktaş defeated Hapoel Be'er Sheva with an aggregate score of 5–2 and then moved on to defeat Olympiacos with an aggregate score of 5–2. Beşiktaş will play Lyon on 13 and 20 April in the team's third ever Quarter Finals.

Knockout phase

Round of 32

Round of 16

Quarter-finals

Squad statistics

Appearances and goals

|-
|colspan="14"|Players away from Beşiktaş on loan:
|-
|colspan="14"|Players who left Beşiktaş during the season:

|}

Goal scorers

Disciplinary record

Notes

References

External links
 Official website
 UEFA Champions League club profile

Beşiktaş J.K. seasons
Turkish football clubs 2016–17 season
Besiktas
Turkish football championship-winning seasons